Lily Topples the World is a 2021 American documentary film, which follows acclaimed domino toppler Lily Hevesh as she rises as an artist, role model, and young woman. Directed by Jeremy Workman, the film also marks the producing debut of actress Kelly Marie Tran.

Lily Topples the World had its world premiere at South by Southwest on March 16, 2021, where it won the Grand Jury Award for Best Documentary. Soon after, the film won the Audience Award for Best Documentary at the 2021 San Francisco International Film Festival. In May 2021, it was announced that the documentary was a high-profile acquisition of Discovery+. It was released on Discovery+ for streaming on August 26, 2021, as well as a limited theatrical release on August 27, 2021. Celebrated by critics, the film garnered a "Certified Fresh" rating on Rotten Tomatoes.

Synopsis
The film is a coming-of-age story of 20-year-old Lily Hevesh, the world's most acclaimed domino artist and the only woman in her field.

Reception
The film was widely praised by critics upon its release.  

Kalyn Corrigan of /Film gave the film a 9 out of 10 rating, stating that the film is "a much needed serotonin boost that will have you grinning from start to finish."

Awards 
 South by Southwest, Grand Jury Award Best Documentary
 San Francisco International Film Festival, Audience Award Best Documentary 
15th Cinema Eye Honors, Audience Choice Prize Nominee and "The Unforgettables" Distinction

References

External links
 
 
 

2021 films
2021 documentary films
American documentary films
Biographical documentary films
Documentary films about visual artists
2020s English-language films
2020s American films